The 2007 Campeonato Sudamericano Copa América, known simply as the 2007 Copa América or 2007 Copa América Venezuela, was the 42nd edition of the Copa América, the South-American championship for international association football teams. The competition was organized by CONMEBOL, South America's football governing body, and was held between 26 June and 15 July in Venezuela, which hosted the tournament for the first time.

The competition was won by Brazil (they were also the defending champions), who beat Argentina 3–0 in the final.
Mexico took third place by beating Uruguay 3–1 in the third-place match. Brazil thus won the right to represent CONMEBOL at the 2009 FIFA Confederations Cup.

Competing nations 
As with previous tournaments, all ten members of CONMEBOL participated in the competition. In order to bring the number of competing teams to twelve, CONMEBOL invited Mexico and the United States, the two highest ranking CONCACAF teams in the FIFA World Rankings. Just as in every tournament since 1993, Mexico accepted the invitation without reservation. The United States, on the other hand, rejected the invitation due to scheduling conflicts with the 2007 Major League Soccer season. CONMEBOL then proceeded to invite Costa Rica, the third highest CONCACAF team in FIFA's ranking. In the end, the United States accepted the invitation.

 
 
  (holders)
 
 
 
  (invitee)
 
 
  (invitee)
 
  (hosts)

Venues 
For this Copa América, the organizing committee decided to choose eight cities to hold the tournament. A total of 14 cities presented proposal before the committee, of which they rejected proposals from Barquisimeto, Maracay, Valencia, Valera, Portuguesa and Miranda for not meeting established requirements. The cities of Barinas, Caracas, Ciudad Guayana, Maracaibo, Maturín, Mérida, Puerto la Cruz and San Cristóbal were selected to host the tournament. Later on, the organizing committee reconsidered the candidacy of Barquisimeto, based on the proposal of a new stadium to be built for the city. With a final nine host cities, the 2007 edition broke the previous records for host cities set by the 2004 Copa América in Peru, which used seven.

Officials 
On 30 May 2007, CONMEBOL announced the list of match officials for the competition. The list included one match official from every country (except Paraguay, which had two). From these thirteen, six officiated in the 2006 FIFA World Cup: Carlos Simon, Óscar Ruiz, Carlos Amarilla, Jorge Larrionda, and Armando Archundia.

  Carlos Chandía
  Sergio Pezzotta
  René Ortubé
  Carlos Simon
  Óscar Ruiz
  Mauricio Reinoso
  Armando Archundia
  Carlos Amarilla
  Carlos Torres
  Víctor Rivera
  Jorge Larrionda
  Baldomero Toledo
  Manuel Andarcia

Draw
The draw for the competition took place on 14 February 2007 in the Teresa Carreño Theater in Caracas.

Squads 

Each association had to present a list of twenty-three players to compete in the competition.

Group stage 
The first round, or group stage, saw the twelve teams divided into three groups of four teams. Each group was a round-robin of six games, where each team played one match against each of the other teams in the same group. Teams were awarded three points for a win, one point for a draw and none for a defeat. The teams finishing first, second and two best-placed third teams in each group qualified for the Quarter-finals.

Tie-breaking criteria
Teams were ranked on the following criteria:
1. Greater number of points in all group matches
2. Goal difference in all group matches
3. Greater number of goals scored in all group matches
4. Head-to-head results
5. Drawing of lots by the CONMEBOL Organising Committee

All times are in Venezuela Standard Time (UTC–4).

Group A

Group B

Group C

Ranking of third-placed teams 
At the end of the first stage, a comparison was made between the third-placed teams of each group. The two best third-placed teams advanced to the quarter-finals.

Knockout stage

Quarter-finals

Semi-finals

Third-place match

Final

Result

Awards 
 Top Goalscorer : Robinho  
 Most Valuable Player : Robinho Robinho disputará a Messi y Riquelme la Copa América y el MVP del torneo
 Best Goal : Lionel Messi

Goalscorers 
With six goals, Robinho was the top scorer in the tournament. In total, 86 goals were scored by 53 different players, with only one of them credited as an own goal.

6 goals
  Robinho

5 goals
  Román Riquelme

4 goals
  Nery Castillo

3 goals

  Hernán Crespo
  Júlio Baptista
  Humberto Suazo
  Omar Bravo
  Salvador Cabañas
  Roque Santa Cruz
  Diego Forlán

2 goals

  Javier Mascherano
  Lionel Messi
  Jaime Moreno
  Jaime Castrillón
  Cuauhtémoc Blanco
  Claudio Pizarro
  Sebastián Abreu

1 goal

  Pablo Aimar
  Gabriel Heinze
  Diego Milito
  Carlos Tevez
  Juan Carlos Arce
  Jhasmani Campos
  Dani Alves
  Josué
  Juan
  Vágner Love
  Maicon
  Carlos Villanueva
  Edixon Perea
  Christian Benítez
  Édison Méndez
  Antonio Valencia
  Fernando Arce
  Andrés Guardado
  Ramón Morales
  Gerardo Torrado
  Édgar Barreto
  Óscar Cardozo
  Paolo Guerrero
  Juan Carlos Mariño
  Miguel Villalta
  Ricardo Clark
  Eddie Johnson
  Pablo García
  Cristian Rodríguez
  Vicente Sánchez
  Juan Arango
  Daniel Arismendi
  Alejandro Cichero
  Giancarlo Maldonado
  Ricardo Páez

Own goal
  Roberto Ayala (for Brazil)

Team of the Tournament

Final positions

Marketing

Sponsorship 
Global Platinum Sponsor
 LG
 MasterCard

Global Gold Sponsor
 Telefónica (Movistar is the brand advertised)

Global Silver Sponsor
 Casio
 Anheuser-Busch InBev (Skol is the brand advertised)

Charitable Partner
 UNICEF

Local Supplier
 PDVSA
 Empresas Polar (Maltin Polar is the brand advertised)
 Ole Ole
 Traffic Group

Match ball 
The official match ball for the tournament was the Nike Mercurial Veloci. The ball was presented on 14 February 2007, prior to a friendly match played between Venezuela and New Zealand, by the president of the Venezuelan Football Federation, Rafael Esquivel, to the mayor of Maracaibo, Giancarlo Di Martino – head of the local organising committee.

Mascot 

Guaky is a scarlet macaw, a bird representative of Venezuela. He wore the traditional jersey Venezuela national football team burgundy and football shoes. Under their wings the characteristic tricolor national flag, with its eight stars on their wings.

To choose the official mascot held a contest in which proposals received 4,500,000 of Venezuelan children and adolescents at a school. The winning draw corresponded to the 15-year-old Jhoyling Zabaleta. The final design was commissioned to Fractal Studio, bring life and a "strong personality, cheerful and sport" that accompanied the event during its realization. The name of the pet, Guaky was subsequently elected by an online survey, where that option was a 54.17% of preferences.

Theme songs 
 "Gol" by Venezuelan singer Juan Carlos Luces, was the main theme song of the tournament, which was performed during the draw and the opening ceremonies.
 "Baila la Copa" by Venezuelan singer Ose was an official anthem for the tournament.

References

External links 

 Copa América 2007 Website – official website
 Confederación Sudamericana de Fútbol – official website
 FuriaVinotinto – Unofficial Forum
 Copa América 2007 at ESPN 

 
Copa America
Copa América tournaments
International association football competitions hosted by Venezuela
Copa Am
June 2007 sports events in South America
July 2007 sports events in South America
Sports competitions in Caracas
Sports competitions in Maracaibo
21st century in Caracas
Barinas, Venezuela
Sport in Barquisimeto
Maturín
Sport in Puerto la Cruz
San Cristóbal, Táchira
21st century in Maracaibo